Jacob Gerritse Lansing (June 6, 1681 - December 6, 1767) was an early American silversmith. His grandson was also named Jacob Gerritse Lansing (christened April 4, 1736 - November 25, 1803) and was also a silversmith; both were active in Albany, New York.

His works are collected at the Albany Institute of History and Art, Colonial Williamsburg, Henry Ford Museum, and Metropolitan Museum of Art.

References 
 Silver in the Fur Trade, 1680-1820, Martha Wilson Hamilton, Martha Hamilton Publishing, 1995, page 196. .
 A directory of American silver, pewter, and silver plate, Ralph M. Kovel, Terry H. Kovel, 1961, page 163. .
 Antiques at the Henry Ford Museum, Henry Ford Museum and Greenfield Village, Crown Publishers, 1958, page 32.
 Reflecting Changes In Taste And Fashion: Tankards And Teapots From The Glen-Sanders Collection, from "Antiques & Fine Art", Summer 2016.
 Jacob Gerritse Lansing, Silversmith

American silversmiths